Germelina Viana Hernandez (born June 1, 1946), better known by her stage name Alicia Alonzo, is a Filipina actress in movies and television in the Philippines. She is the sister of action star Anthony Alonzo.

Career
She was a flight stewardess of Philippine Air Lines whose fate took a dramatic turn when her younger brother, actor Anthony Alonzo†, saw an advertisement by Lea Productions searching for a new star.

She joined showbiz from 1967 in Kapag Puso'y Sinugatan, Together Again, So Happy Together, Kwatang: A Star Is Born and Karate Kid.

She appeared in more than 140 movies and television shows up to date including Donata (1968), Marahas Ang Daigdig (1970), Kamay Na Gumagapang (1974), Kutong Lupa (1976), and Roberta (1979), among others. In 1980's, Alonzo appeared in Uhaw Sa Kalayaan (1980), Bakit Bughaw Ang Langit? (1981) starring Nora Aunor and Dennis Roldan, Santa Claus Is Coming To Town! (1982) with Robert Arevalo, Liza Lorena and Raoul Aragon, Condemned (1984) starring Nora Aunor, Dan Alvaro, Gina Alajar and Sonny Parsons, Sa Dibdib Ng Sierra Madre (1985), Saan Nagtatago Ang Pag-ibig? (1987) starring Vilma Santos, Ricky Davao and Gloria Romero, Tamis Ng Unang Halik (1989) with Kristina Paner and Cris Villanueva. She did movies also in 1990's Sagot Ng Puso (1990) with Sheryl Cruz and Romnick Sarmenta, Alyas Boy Kano (1992), Warat (1999) and Soltera (1999) with Maricel Soriano.

She was also cast in a classic Philippine TV series Anna Liza played by Julie Vega aired from 1980 to 1986. She also appeared in TV series like Ikaw Lang Ang Mamahalin (2001), Mulawin (2004), Lupin (2007), Mula Sa Puso (2011) and Maalaala Mo Kaya series.

In 2018, she staged a comeback on GMA Network after 4 years to play a grandmother role in Kara Mia.

Personal life
Her parents are Alfredo Hernandez and Lourdes Viana. She is the mother of actor Jon Hernandez, with former actor Ross Rival (eldest brother of Phillip Salvador).

Awards and nominations
1984 Nominated FAMAS Award Best Supporting Actress Bago Kumalat Ang Kamandag (1983)
1983 Won Metro Manila Film Festival Best Supporting Actress Bago Kumalat Ang Kamandag (1983)
1983 Nominated FAMAS Award Best Supporting Actress Bambang (1982)
1982 Nominated Gawad Urian Award Best Supporting Actress Playgirl (1981)
1978 Nominated FAMAS Award Best Actress Tahan Na Empoy, Tahan (1977)
1978 Nominated Gawad Urian Award Best Actress Tahan Na Empoy, Tahan (1977)

Filmography

Television

Film

References

External links

1946 births
Living people
Filipino film actresses
Filipino television actresses
GMA Network personalities
ABS-CBN personalities